This is a list of 215 species in the genus Centris, centris bees.

Centris species

 Centris adani Cockerell, 1949 i c g
 Centris adunca Moure, 2003 i c g
 Centris aenea Lepeletier, 1841 i c g
 Centris aeneiventris Mocsáry, 1899 i c g
 Centris aethiocesta Snelling, 1984 i c g
 Centris aethiops Cresson, 1865 i c g
 Centris aethyctera Snelling, 1974 i c g
 Centris agameta Snelling, 1974 i c g
 Centris agilis Smith, 1874 i c g
 Centris agiloides Snelling, 1984 i c g
 Centris albiceps Friese, 1899 i c g
 Centris americana (Klug, 1810) i c g
 Centris amica Moure, 1960 i c g
 Centris analis (Fabricius, 1804) i c g
 Centris ancashsumaq  g
 Centris angustifrons Snelling, 1966 i c g
 Centris anomala Snelling, 1966 i c g
 Centris aterrima Smith, 1854 i c g
 Centris atra Friese, 1900 i c g
 Centris atripes Mocsáry, 1899 i c g b
 Centris barbadensis Cockerell, 1939 i c g
 Centris bicolor Lepeletier, 1841 i c g
 Centris bicornuta Mocsáry, 1899 i c g
 Centris bitaeniata Moure, 2002 i c g
 Centris boliviensis Mocsáry, 1899 i c g
 Centris braccata Packard, 1869 i c g
 Centris brethesi Schrottky, 1902 i c g
 Centris buchholzi Herbst, 1918 i c g
 Centris burgdorfi Friese, 1900 i c g
 Centris caelebs Friese, 1900 i c g
 Centris caesalpiniae Cockerell, 1897 i c g b
 Centris californica Timberlake, 1940 i c g
 Centris carolae Snelling, 1966 i c g
 Centris carrikeri Cockerell, 1919 i c g
 Centris catsal Roig-Alsina, 2000 i c g
 Centris caxiensis Ducke, 1907 i c g
 Centris chilensis (Spinola, 1851) i c
 Centris chlorura Cockerell, 1919 i c g
 Centris chrysitis Lepeletier, 1841 i c g
 Centris cineraria Smith, 1854 i c g
 Centris clypeata Lepeletier, 1841 i c g
 Centris cockerelli Fox, 1899 i c g b
 Centris collaris Lepeletier, 1841 i c g
 Centris confusa Moure, 1960 i c g
 Centris conspersa Mocsáry, 1899 i c g
 Centris cordillerana Roig-Alsina, 2000 i c g
 Centris cornuta Cresson, 1865 i c g
 Centris crassipes Smith, 1874 i c g
 Centris danunciae Moure, 2002 i c g
 Centris decipiens Moure & Seabra, 1960 i c g
 Centris decolorata Lepeletier, 1841 i c g
 Centris decorata Smith, 1854 i c g
 Centris deiopeia Gribodo, 1891 i c g
 Centris dentata Smith, 1854 i c g
 Centris denudans Lepeletier, 1841 i c g
 Centris denudens Lepeletier, 1841 g
 Centris derasa Lepeletier, 1841 i c g
 Centris dichrootricha (Moure, 1945) i c g
 Centris difformis Smith, 1854 i c g
 Centris dimidiata (Olivier, 1789) i c g
 Centris dirrhoda Moure, 1960 i c g
 Centris discolor Smith, 1874 i c g
 Centris dixanthozona Moure & Seabra, 1962 i c g
 Centris dorsata Lepeletier, 1841 i c g
 Centris ectypha Snelling, 1974 i c g
 Centris eisenii Fox, 1893 i c g
 Centris elegans Smith, 1874 i c g
 Centris ephippia Smith, 1854 i c g
 Centris errans Fox, 1899 i c g b  (wandering centris)
 Centris erythrosara Moure & Seabra, 1960 i c g
 Centris erythrotricha Seabra & Moure, 1961 i c g
 Centris escomeli Cockerell, 1926 i c g
 Centris euphenax Cockerell, 1913 i c g
 Centris eurypatana Snelling, 1984 i c g
 Centris facialis Mocsáry, 1899 i c g
 Centris fasciata Smith, 1854 i c g
 Centris ferrisi Cockerell, 1924 i c g
 Centris ferruginea Lepeletier, 1841 i c g
 Centris festiva Smith, 1854 i c g
 Centris fisheri Snelling, 1974 i c g
 Centris flavicans Moure, 2003 i c g
 Centris flavifrons (Fabricius, 1775) i c g
 Centris flavilabris Mocsáry, 1899 i c g
 Centris flavofasciata Friese, 1900 i c g
 Centris flavohirta Friese, 1900 i c g
 Centris flavopilosa Friese, 1925 i c g
 Centris flavothoracica Friese, 1899 i c g
 Centris fluviatilis Friese, 1924 i c g
 Centris frieseana Moure, 2003 i c g
 Centris fulva Friese, 1924 i c g
 Centris furcata Fabricius, 1804 g
 Centris fuscata Lepeletier, 1841 i c g
 Centris garleppi (Schrottky, 1913) i c g
 Centris gavisa Snelling, 1988 i c g
 Centris gelida Snelling, 1984 i c g
 Centris griseola Snelling, 1984 i c g
 Centris haemorrhoidalis (Fabricius, 1775) i c g
 Centris harbisoni Snelling, 1974 i c g
 Centris heithausi Snelling, 1974 i c g
 Centris hoffmanseggiae Cockerell, 1897 i c g b
 Centris horvathi Friese, 1900 i c g
 Centris hyptidis Ducke, 1908 i c g
 Centris hyptidoides Roig-Alsina, 2000 i c g
 Centris insignis Smith, 1854 i c g
 Centris insularis Smith, 1874 i c g
 Centris intermixta Friese, 1900 i c g
 Centris jujuyana Roig-Alsina, 2000 i c g
 Centris klugii Friese, 1900 i c g
 Centris labiata Friese, 1904 i c g
 Centris laevibullata Snelling, 1966 i c g
 Centris langsdorfii Blanchard, 1840 i c g
 Centris lanipes (Fabricius, 1775) i c g
 Centris lanosa Cresson, 1872 i c g b
 Centris lateritia Friese, 1899 i c g
 Centris laticincta (Spinola, 1841) i c g
 Centris leprieuri (Spinola, 1841) i c g
 Centris lilacina Cockerell, 1919 i c g
 Centris longimana Fabricius, 1804 i c g
 Centris lutea Friese, 1899 i c g
 Centris lyngbyei Jensen-Haarup, 1908 i c g
 Centris machadoi Azevedo & Silveira, 2005 i c g
 Centris maculifrons Smith, 1854 i c g
 Centris maranhensis Ducke, 1911 i c g
 Centris mariae Mocsáry, 1896 i c g
 Centris maroniana Cockerell, 1917 i c g
 Centris meaculpa Snelling, 1984 i c g
 Centris melampoda Moure, 2003 i c g
 Centris melanochlaena Smith, 1874 i c g
 Centris merrillae Cockerell, 1919 i c g
 Centris metathoracica Friese, 1912 i c g
 Centris mexicana Smith, 1854 i c g
 Centris mixta Friese, 1904 i c g
 Centris mocsaryi Friese, 1899 i c g
 Centris moerens (Perty, 1833) i c g
 Centris moldenkei Toro & Chiappa, 1989 i c g
 Centris mourei Roig-Alsina, 2000 i c g
 Centris muralis Burmeister, 1876 i c g
 Centris neffi Moure, 2000 i c g
 Centris nigerrima (Spinola, 1851) i c g
 Centris nigriventris Burmeister, 1876 i c g
 Centris nigrocaerulea Smith, 1874 i c g
 Centris nigrofasciata Friese, 1899 i c g
 Centris nitens Lepeletier, 1841 i c g
 Centris nitida Smith, 1874 i c g b
 Centris niveofasciata Friese, 1899 i c g
 Centris nobilis Westwood, 1840 i c g
 Centris nordestina  g
 Centris obscurior Michener, 1954 i c g
 Centris obsoleta Lepeletier, 1841 i c g
 Centris orellanai Ruiz, 1940 i c g
 Centris pachysoma Cockerell, 1919 i c g
 Centris pallida Fox, 1899 i c g b  (pallid bee)
 Centris plumbea Moure, 2002 i c g
 Centris plumipes Smith, 1854 i c g
 Centris poecila Lepeletier, 1841 i c g
 Centris proxima Friese, 1899 g
 Centris pseudoephippia Friese, 1900 i c g
 Centris pulchra Moure, Oliveira & Viana, 2003 i c g
 Centris quadrimaculata Packard, 1869 i c g
 Centris restrepoi Moure, 2002 i c g
 Centris rhodadelpha Cockerell, 1939 i c g
 Centris rhodomelas Timberlake, 1940 i c g
 Centris rhodophthalma Pérez, 1911 i c g
 Centris rhodoprocta Moure & Seabra, 1960 i c g
 Centris rhodopus Cockerell, 1897 i c g b  (red-legged centris)
 Centris rubripes Friese, 1899 i c g
 Centris rufipes Friese, 1899 i c g
 Centris rufohirta Friese, 1900 i c g
 Centris rufosuffusa Cockerell, 1935 i c g
 Centris rupestris Azevedo & Silveira, 2005 i c g
 Centris ruthannae Snelling, 1966 i c g
 Centris satana Snelling, 1984 i c g
 Centris scopipes Friese, 1899 i c g
 Centris scutellaris Friese, 1899 i c g
 Centris semicaerulea Smith, 1874 i c g
 Centris sericea Friese, 1899 i c g
 Centris similis (Fabricius, 1804) i c g
 Centris singularis Ducke, 1904 i c g
 Centris smithiana Friese, 1900 i c g
 Centris smithii Cresson, 1879 i c g
 Centris spilopoda Moure, 1969 i c g
 Centris sponsa Smith, 1854 i c g
 Centris superba Ducke, 1904 i c g
 Centris tamarugalis Toro & Chiappa, 1989 i c g
 Centris tarsata Smith, 1874 i c g
 Centris terminata Smith, 1874 i c g
 Centris testacea Lepeletier, 1841 i c g
 Centris tetrazona Moure & Seabra, 1962 i c g
 Centris thelyopsis  g
 Centris thoracica Lepeletier, 1841 i c g
 Centris tiburonensis Cockerell, 1923 i c g
 Centris toroi Zanella, 2002 i c g
 Centris torquata Moure & Seabra, 1962 i c g
 Centris transversa Pérez, 1905 i c g
 Centris tricolor Friese, 1899 i c g
 Centris trigonoides Lepeletier, 1841 i c g
 Centris unifasciata (Schrottky, 1913) i c g
 Centris urens Moure, 2000 i c g
 Centris vallecaucensis  g
 Centris vanduzeei Cockerell, 1923 i c g
 Centris vardyorum Roig-Alsina, 2000 i c g
 Centris varia (Erichson, 1848) i c g
 Centris versicolor (Fabricius, 1775) i c g
 Centris vidua Mocsáry, 1899 i c g
 Centris violacea Lepeletier, 1841 i c g
 Centris vittata Lepeletier, 1841 i c g
 Centris vogeli Roig-Alsina, 2000 i c g
 Centris vulpecula Burmeister, 1876 i c g
 Centris weilenmanni Friese, 1900 i c g
 Centris willineri Moure, 2000 i c g
 Centris xanthocnemis (Perty, 1833) i c g
 Centris xanthomelaena Moure & Castro, 2001 i c g
 Centris xochipillii Snelling, 1984 i c g
 Centris zacateca Snelling, 1966 i c g
 Centris zonata Mocsáry, 1899 i c g

Data sources: i = ITIS, c = Catalogue of Life, g = GBIF, b = Bugguide.net

References

Centris